Enzo Rao (born January 13, 1957, in Palermo) is an Italian musician who plays a number of instruments, including bass guitar, oud, saz, jaw harp and violin, in a variety of folk and popular styles.  He has performed with artists like Rakali, Glen Velez and Claudio Lo Cascio.  In 1988 he founded the project Shamal which combines music from across the Mediterranean region.  Rao has won the first prize in the National Composer Contest held by Radio RAI for his song "In viaggio!".  Rao has also worked in composition for film scores.

External links
 Homepage of Enzo Rao 

1957 births
Living people
Musicians from Palermo
Composers from Sicily
Jaw harp players
20th-century Italian composers
21st-century Italian composers